Vyatchina is a rural locality (a village) in Yurlinskoye Rural Settlement, Yurlinsky District, Perm Krai, Russia. The population was 131 as of 2010. There are 2 streets.

Geography 
Vyatchina is located 21 km southeast of Yurla (the district's administrative centre) by road. Polukhina is the nearest rural locality.

References 

Rural localities in Yurlinsky District